A representative image is an indirect visual depiction of the message, for example, used when that particular event has not been visually captured or is visually available. The degree of representativeness can vary significantly. The accuracy of the representative image in areas such as tourism can significantly affect users using search engines.

See also 

 Representation (arts)

References

Further reading 

 

Internet search engines